The following is a list of characters that first appeared in the British soap opera Emmerdale in 1994, by order of first appearance.

Eileen Pollock

Eileen Pollock  is the first wife of Eric Pollard (Chris Chittell). She arrives in Emmerdale after reading about the Emmerdale plane crash and the death of Eric's second wife Elizabeth Feldmann (Kate Dove). She threatens to expose Eric as a bigamist until he pays her off for a divorce. She then leaves the village and they divorce after 30 years of marriage, although they have only been together for a short amount of time during the marriage itself.

In November 2018, Eric reveals to Chas Dingle (Lucy Pargeter) that he and Eileen parted ways after their son, Edward, was born stillborn in 1978. The grief of their loss led to them leading separate lives, and ultimately Eric abandoning Eileen, changing his name and not seeing her again until 1994. He advises Chas to not let her and her partner Paddy Kirk (Dominic Brunt) drift apart like he and Eileen did after their newborn baby dies.

Victoria Sugden

Betty Eagleton

Reg Dawson

Reg Dawson  is the first husband of Viv Windsor (Deena Payne) and father of Scott Windsor (Toby Cockerell). He first appeared on 5 May 1994.

Reg, who abandoned Scott and Viv early in Scott's life, arrives in Emmerdale to see Scott after serving time in prison. His stay causes friction with Vic (Alun Lewis), Viv's current husband after Reg declares that he is going to get Viv and Scott back. Reg eventually leaves. Several days later, Reg and his gang commit an armed robbery on the post office and take Viv and Shirley Turner (Rachel Davies) hostage at Home Farm. The situation worsens when Reg shoots and kills one of his henchmen Simmy (Stuart St. Paul), mistaking him for a police officer. Later into the siege, Viv argues with Reg and he is about to shoot her when Shirley jumps in the way of the gun and takes the bullet and dies instantly. Viv then tries to get Reg to give himself up and tells him she will say Shirley's death is an accident. Reg, realising there is no way out, plans for him and Viv to die together in a suicide pact. Before this can happen, a police marksman shoots Reg dead.  In his will, he leaves Viv several thousand pounds, but a stipulation said she had to leave her current husband, to receive the money. She declines and stays with Vic.

Roy Glover

Ned Glover

Edward "Ned" Glover first appeared in 1994 and was a series regular for five years, departing in 1999, before returning for a brief stint in 2000. Ned married his wife Jan Glover in 1971 and had three children: Dave, in 1973, Linda, in 1978 and Roy, in 1980. Ned had known the Sugden family for years and helped them out on their farm, indicating that he had lived in the village before. In October 1994, he was challenged by his old adversary Zak Dingle to a bare-knuckle fist fight and won. Jan left the village in 1998 after she and Ned split up, with Ned following a year later. By the time he originally left the village in 1999, he had already lost two of his three children, Dave in a fire at Home Farm in December 1996 and Linda in a car crash in October 1997. This had caused his marriage breakdown. Ned left the village to run a bar in Ibiza with an old girlfriend, Dawn Wilkins. Ned returned in July 2000 for his son Roy's leaving storyline. Ned comes back to the village to offer Roy and his wife Kelly the chance to come with him. Roy agrees to think about it and Ned returns to Ibiza. Roy joins him a few weeks later after ending his marriage to Kelly at the airport.

Jan Glover

Jan Glover (also Worrel) first appeared in August 1994 with her husband Ned and their children. Jan had married Ned in 1971 and the couple had three children: Dave, in 1973, Linda, in 1978 and Roy, in 1980. Jan worked as a barmaid at the Woolpack pub. She was devastated by the deaths of two of her children: Dave in a fire at Home Farm during Christmas 1996 and Linda in a car crash in October 1997. Jan suffered a nervous breakdown after this and abducted James Tate, blaming James' mother Kim for her children's deaths. Jan is sectioned but later discharged and returns home. However her actions put strain on her marriage and when Jan realises that Ned no longer trusts her, the couple separate. Jan leaves the village to live with her sister, June Worrel, for a fresh start.

Linda Fowler

Dave Glover

Ben Dingle

Benedict Alan "Ben" Dingle  is the son of Zak Dingle. He appeared in 1994.

Ben is the first member of the Dingle family to appear in Emmerdale. During a fight with Luke McAllister, Ben dies of a heart defect. It originally appears as if Luke had murdered him, and the Dingles continue to blame him even after the truth comes out.

Butch Dingle

Butch Dingle , played by Paul Loughran, arrived in the village in August 1994 to confront Luke McAllister (Noah Huntley), who Butch believed was responsible for the death of his brother Ben (Steve Fury). Butch caused trouble for Luke for the remainder of the year in revenge.

Butch got his nickname because at six years old he had come home from school with some flowers which he wanted to dry and press in a book. His father Zak (Steve Halliwell) was concerned that his son was too sensitive so he started calling him "Butch" in an attempt to get him to behave more like a man. As a result of this, Butch felt he was unable to develop as a person properly and unable to express his true feelings and he became a bully and troublemaker during his early years on the show.

However, he mellowed as the years went by and lost his virginity to nanny Sophie Wright (Jane Cameron) when they were drunk at New Year 1996/1997. Butch later began stalking Sophie as he couldn't handle her rejection. Butch also had an obsession with his cousin Mandy Dingle (Lisa Riley). In November 1998, he married Mandy but she only went through with it for financial gain and not because she loved him. Butch felt himself in love with her and was sad that his feelings were not reciprocated. Butch later divorced Mandy and fell in love with Emily Wylie (Kate McGregor). Emily and Butch had a lot in common and both considered themselves to be misfits. Emily decided to stay in Emmerdale with Butch rather than leave the village with her father.

Butch died in hospital of injuries sustained in the bus crash on 24 March 2000. Butch had been a passenger in the community bus when it was hit by an out-of-control lorry driven by Pete Collins (Kirk Smith). Before dying, Butch married Emily on his death bed. Butch was buried next to his brother, Ben, who died nearly six years earlier. The epitaph on their tombstone is 'Dead but still Dingles'.

Zak Dingle

Harry Barker

Harry Barker is the uncle of Kim Tate who arrives in the village on her wedding day to Frank Tate to give her away.

He strikes up a friendship with Seth Armstrong and Zoe Tate. He gets drunk in the build-up to the ceremony, and the wedding party soon realize that he is withholding something. After nearly collapsing, he tells Kim that he is nervous about giving her away and admits that he is too drunk to do it. Seth then decides to give her away instead, and Harry watches on at the church as Frank and Kim remarry, although Frank is confused as to why Harry was not walking Kim down the aisle.

He leaves Emmerdale shortly afterwards, and does not attend Kim's 'funeral' in 1997.

Tina Dingle

Tina Marie Dingle is the youngest child of Zak and Nellie Dingle. She arrived in the village a few months after her family. Her most famous storyline was in July 1995 when she was going to marry Luke McAllister, claiming to be pregnant with his child. However, this proved to be fake, to get revenge for the death of her brother, Ben, the year before. A few days later, Luke kidnapped her and took her on a mad van drive through the village. She dived out of the van and Luke was killed moments later in an explosion when the van crashed into a wall. 1996 saw Tina caught in a love triangle with Frank Tate and Steve Marchant. She left on Christmas Eve that year as she was sick of being caught in the middle and potentially ending up like Frank's wife Kim, as well as her family life not going anywhere. Her last line was to her cousin and best friend Mandy Dingle, "No, I'm finished here now. I'll see you Mand." Tina then gets in her car and drives out of the village, as the song Moving On Up plays on the car radio.

In 1998, writers from Inside Soap published an article about the top ten characters they wanted to return to soap. Tina was featured and they described her as "the bitchy daughter of Zak and Nellie, whose combination of guile and Dingle cunning made her the perfect match for Kim Tate." They added that over time Tina reinvented herself as a "high-flying businesswoman."

Others

References

1994
, Emmerdale